German submarine U-609 was a Type VIIC U-boat built for Nazi Germany's Kriegsmarine for service during World War II.
She was laid down on 7 April 1941 by Blohm & Voss, Hamburg as yard number 585, launched on 23 December 1941 and commissioned on 12 February 1942 under Oberleutnant zur See Klaus Rudloff.

Design
German Type VIIC submarines were preceded by the shorter Type VIIB submarines. U-609 had a displacement of  when at the surface and  while submerged. She had two shafts and two  propellers.

U-609 was fitted with five  torpedo tubes (four fitted at the bow and one at the stern), fourteen torpedoes, one  SK C/35 naval gun, 220 rounds, and a  C/30 anti-aircraft gun. The boat had a complement of between forty-four and sixty.

Service history
The boat's career began with training at 5th U-boat Flotilla on 12 February 1942, followed by active service on 1 August 1942 as part of the 6th U-boat Flotilla for the remainder of her service.

Wolfpacks
U-609 took part in six wolfpacks, namely:
 Vorwärts (25 August – 1 September 1942)
 Panther (13 – 16 October 1942)
 Draufgänger (6 – 11 December 1942)
 Raufbold (11 – 18 December 1942)
 Landsknecht (19 – 28 January 1943)
 Pfeil (1 – 7 February 1943)

Fate
U-609 was sunk on 6 February 1943 in the North Atlantic in position , by depth charges from the Free French corvette FFNF Lobelia. All hands were lost.

Previously recorded fate
U-609 was sunk on 7 February 1943 in the North Atlantic in position , by depth charges from the Free French corvette FFNF Lobelia. All hands were lost.

Summary of raiding history

References

Bibliography

External links

German Type VIIC submarines
1941 ships
U-boats commissioned in 1942
Ships lost with all hands
U-boats sunk in 1943
U-boats sunk by depth charges
U-boats sunk by French warships
World War II shipwrecks in the Atlantic Ocean
World War II submarines of Germany
Ships built in Hamburg
Maritime incidents in February 1943